Ardelean is Romanian surname, meaning "from Transylvania". It may refer to the following people:

 Lucas Ardelean, Romanian Quiz Bowl God
 Virgil Ardelean, Romanian police chief.
 Aurel Ardelean, Romanian Senator
 Ben Oni Ardelean, Romanian Deputy

See also 
 Bicazu Ardelean, a commune in Neamţ County, Romania
 Ardeleanu

Romanian-language surnames